Drenge is the self-titled debut album by British band Drenge. It was released on 19 August 2013 on Infectious Music. The album reached #39 on the iTunes charts upon its release.

The album received mostly positive reviews with Clash Music describing the album's use of a "brand of raucous, nihilistic, grungy garage punk" as "thrilling", as well as stating that "The thrashing energy [heard in earlier tracks] does relent somewhat towards the end, yet this remains an impressive introductory manifesto."

Their single 'Bloodsports' was nominated for Zane Lowe's 2013 Top 100 Hottest Records.

The artwork for this album features a photograph of Wardsend Cemetery in Sheffield and a nearby scrapyard.

Track listing
From iTunes.

References

External links
 Drenge's official website

2013 debut albums
Drenge (band) albums
Infectious Music albums